The Sydney Steam Motor Trams were built for and operated by the New South Wales Government Tramways of Australia.

History
Steam trams were introduced when four steam tram motors imported to Sydney as a temporary transport for the International Exhibition of 1879.  It was built at the Baldwin Locomotive Works, Philadelphia, United States and hauled double decker trailers conveying passengers from the Redfern railway terminus to near the Botanic Gardens.

A Beyer, Peacock and Company steam tram of 1885 was sent to Australia in 1886 as a trial unit by the NSWGT for comparison against the Baldwin steam tram. The Baldwin design prevailed and this engine returned to England in 1889 to become Beyer Peacock works shunter No. 2. The engine is rumoured to have fallen into the sea on its return voyage.

Design
The steam tram motor is essentially a small enclosed saddle tank locomotive steam motor with four driving wheels in an 0-4-0 arrangement. A wooden cab encloses the entire locomotive, which features five windows along each side. Access to the cab is through doors from either the front or back platform. The tram is powered by an orthodox locomotive type boiler, American bar type framing, conventional "D" type slide valves and spring suspension. Coke and later coal was carried in a bunker on the rear platform and water in the semi-circular saddle tank.

Typical specifications for an 11" Baldwin steam tram motor:

Cylinders: 11" diameter x 16" stroke
Tractive Effort: 120 psi steam, 5,500 lb at 10 mph
Weight: 14 tons 2 cwt
Length: 17 feet 2 inches
Width: 8 feet 6 inches

Service
The Redfern to Botanic Gardens tramway was planned to operate for the duration of the exhibition. Proving so popular an extension to Randwick was opened in 1880. The peak of steam working was reached during 1894, when the length of the tramway reached 40 miles (64.7 km) when there were over 100 steam trams in service. In 1905-6 steam tram routes were replaced by electric trams with steam trams gradually relegated to outer suburbs.

Steam trams also operated on regional New South Wales tramways at Newcastle, Maitland, and Broken Hill.

The Steam Tram Motors in service were:

(*)    Numbers 42 and 43 were two Kitson steam motors, ordered in 1881, that were unreliable in service.

(**)  Number 55 was an experimental steam motor, made by Merryweather & Sons, that arrived in 1881.

(***) Numbers 70 to 75 were six 'Baldwin-Downe' steam motors, delivered 1883—1884, that were first bogies of combined motor-passenger cars known as 'Jumbos'.

Demise and Preservation
The last NSWGT steam motor was withdrawn from service in 1937 and replaced by a trolley bus service. Preserved trams are:
 Steam Tram Motor No. 1A, owned by Powerhouse Museum The identity No.1A was applied by the Powerhouse Museum. It is actually Henry Vale & Co of Sydney built Steam Motor 28a. Makers number 52.
 Steam Tram Motor No. 103a, [1891] at Valley Heights Steam Tramway Built by Baldwin Locomotive Works in Philadelphia, Pennsylvania, USA. Makers number 11676.
 Steam Tram Motor No. 100, [1891] at Museum of Transport & Technology, Auckland. Built by Baldwin Locomotive Works in Philadelphia, Pennsylvania, USA. Makers number 11885.
The Beyer Peacock steam motor, known as "John Bull", survives at the National Tramway Museum.

Gallery

See also
McCarth & Chinn, "New South Wales Tramcar Handbook 1861-1961",  1974 SPER
Burke, David, "Juggernaut: A story of Sydney in the wild Days of the Steam Trams", Kangaroo Press, Roseville, N.S.W.,1997.
McCarthy, Ken, 'The Era of the Steam Tramway' in "Trolley Wire ", April 1973, Vol. 14 No.2.

References

Tram vehicles of Australia
Trams in Sydney